Newsnight (or BBC Newsnight) is BBC Two's news and current affairs programme, providing in-depth investigation and analysis of the stories behind the day's headlines. The programme is broadcast on weekdays at 22:30 and is also available on BBC iPlayer.

History
Newsnight began on 28 January 1980 at 22:45, although a 15-minute news bulletin using the same title had run on BBC2 for a 13-month period from 1975 to 1976. Its launch was delayed by four months by the Association of Broadcasting Staff, at the time the main BBC trade union. Newsnight was the first programme to be made by means of a direct collaboration between BBC News, then at Television Centre, and the current affairs department, based a short distance away at the now defunct Lime Grove Studios. Staff feared job cuts. The newscast also served as a replacement for the current affairs programme Tonight.

Former presenters include Peter Snow, a regular for seventeen years, Donald MacCormick, Charles Wheeler, Adam Raphael and John Tusa, later boss of the BBC World Service. In the early days each edition had an "auxiliary presenter", a phenomenon pejoratively known at the time as the "Newsnight's wife syndrome". Usually a woman, it was her job to read the news headlines and to introduce minor items. Olivia O'Leary in 1985 became the first principal female presenter; the programme has had a single presenter since 1987. Newsnight is now wholly managed by BBC News.

Until 1988, the start time of Newsnight was flexible, so BBC2 could screen a film at 21:30 to dovetail with the conclusion of the Nine O'Clock News on BBC1. The fixed time slot of 22:30 was established in the face of fierce objections from the then managing director of BBC Television, Bill Cotton, otherwise in charge of all scheduling decisions. The very announcement was made without him even being informed. The affair sparked a widely reported row within the corporation. One protagonist said it would "destroy the BBC".  Newsnight moved to new facilities at Broadcasting House on 15 October 2012.

Between 1999 and 2014 on BBC Two Scotland the offshoot, Newsnight Scotland, presented by Gordon Brewer, replaced the final twenty minutes of the UK programme from Monday to Friday. From May 2014, Newsnight is again shown in full in Scotland but delayed by half an hour to accommodate Newsnight Scotland'''s replacement, Scotland 2014. In more recent years, Scottish viewers have seen the full edition of the show without a separate programme. The flagship news programmes for BBC Scotland are now shown on their separate channel.

In 2020, Newsnight won the Royal Television Society's Daily News Programme of the Year award. It was succeeded in 2021 by the ITV News at Ten.

During the COVID-19 pandemic, Newsnight reverted to a 22:45 start time from 30 March 2020. This was due to Newsnight temporarily sharing a studio with the BBC News at Ten during the pandemic, to cut footfall in Broadcasting House and allow turnover in the studio, with the News at Ten not finishing until 22:35. Further, during the pandemic, some editions presented by Kirsty Wark were presented from BBC Scotland's Pacific Quay headquarters in Glasgow. However, Wark still travelled to London during weeks she presented more episodes of the show (for example when main presenter Emily Maitlis was on holiday).

In October 2020 the show moved to a new studio, but continued to broadcast from 22:45. It returned to the 22:30 slot in May 2021.Newsnights signature tune was composed by George Fenton. Various arrangements have been used over the years.

 Viewing figures 
The programme's average audience in 2015 was 579,000, compared to 867,000 in 2008.

The average audience was 344,000 in September 2018  and by August 2020 around 300,000.

In January 2020 Victoria Derbyshire said Newsnight'''s audience figures were 297,000.

Notable interviews
Jeremy Paxman interviews Michael Howard

In May 1997, Jeremy Paxman pressed former Home Secretary Michael Howard about a meeting with head of the Prison Service Derek Lewis about the possible dismissal of the governor of Parkhurst Prison. Faced with what he considered evasive answers, Paxman put the same question – "Did you threaten to overrule him?" (i.e. Lewis) – to Howard twelve times in succession.

This has become the programme's best known interview. Later, during the twentieth anniversary edition of Newsnight, Paxman told Howard that he had simply been trying to prolong the interview because the next item in the running order was not ready. In 2004, Paxman raised the subject again with Howard, by then leader of the Conservative Party to get a final answer. This time, Howard laughed it off, saying that he had not threatened to overrule the head of the Prison Service. During Paxman's final show in June 2014, Howard briefly appeared in the studio once more, with Paxman simply asking "Did you?", to which Howard replied "No Jeremy, I didn't, but feel free to ask another 11 times."

Emily Maitlis interviews Prince Andrew, Duke of York

In November 2019, Emily Maitlis interviewed Prince Andrew, Duke of York about his relationship with convicted sex offender Jeffrey Epstein, who was found dead in August 2019 whilst awaiting trial. The interview had taken months to prepare and Maitlis received approval only 48 hours before the scheduled airdate.

In the interview, the Duke of York denied having sex with Virginia Giuffre (then known by her maiden name Virginia Roberts) in March 2001, as she had accused, because he had been at home with his daughters, having taken his elder daughter, Beatrice, to a party at PizzaExpress in Woking. The Duke said that he had "no recollection of ever meeting" Giuffre and that he had "absolutely no memory" of a photograph taken of him with Giuffre at Ghislaine Maxwell's house. He said he had investigations carried out to establish whether the photograph was faked, but they had been "inconclusive".

Andrew's responses in the interview received negative reactions from both the media and the public. Maitlis won the Network Presenter of the Year award at the RTS Television Journalism Awards in 2020, while the interview was awarded as the Interview of the Year and the Scoop of the Year.

Accusations of bias
In April 2001, the BBC's Board of Governors ruled that Newsnights coverage of Peter Mandelson's resignation over the Hinduja affair had been politically biased. The governors criticised the programme for only featuring Labour Party supporters on the panel discussing the issue, and no opposition politicians appeared at any stage of the 45-minute episode. The broadcast attracted an outcry in the media with one critic describing it as a "whitewash worthy of a one-party state".

Emily Maitlis was deemed to have broken the BBC's rules on impartiality in the introduction to the 26 May 2020 edition, where she asserted a general perception that Dominic Cummings had broken COVID-19 lockdown rules and an associated public outrage. The BBC said that while the programme contained "fair, reasonable and rigorous journalism", it was "not made clear" that the remarks referred to matters that were questioned in the upcoming content.

Following the commencement of the Boris Johnson government in July 2019, ministers generally refused invitations to appear on the programme. This resulted in Newsnight presenters stating on an almost nightly basis that the government had been asked to appear but that "no one was available" or that they had declined outright. On 12 January 2022, Jacob Rees-Mogg made a rare government appearance on the programme to defend the government's position on "lockdown parties" at 10 Downing Street which occurred during the COVID-19 pandemic. Mogg referred to Scottish Conservatives leader Douglas Ross as "quite a lightweight figure".

Coverage of sexual abuse scandals

In the weeks after the ITV documentary Exposure: The Other Side of Jimmy Savile was broadcast on 3 October 2012, allegations were made that a Newsnight investigation into Savile by reporter Liz MacKean and producer Meirion Jones in December 2011 had been dropped shortly before transmission because it conflicted with tribute programmes prepared after Savile's death. The BBC appointed Nick Pollard, a former Sky News executive, to examine why the investigation was dropped. On 23 October, the Director-General of the BBC, George Entwistle, appeared before the Parliamentary Culture, Media and Sport Committee, and stated that it had been a "catastrophic mistake" to cancel the Newsnight broadcast.

On 2 November 2012, Newsnight broadcast a report falsely accusing, but not naming, a prominent Conservative, Lord McAlpine of child abuse. The veracity of this story collapsed after The Guardian reported a case of mistaken identity on 8 November and the victim retracted the allegation after belatedly being shown a photograph of McAlpine in an item broadcast on the following day. The production team had not contacted McAlpine about the allegations. An apology about the story was made on 9 November during that evening's broadcast of the programme. In an official statement, the BBC announced all ongoing Newsnight investigations were being suspended. The Director of BBC Scotland, Ken MacQuarrie, investigated the circumstances around the programme. His findings were published on 12 November and stated that: The BBC announced that Karen O'Connor would take on the role of Acting Editor of Newsnight.

The Pollard report was published on 19 December 2012. It concluded that the decision to drop the original Newsnight report on the allegations against Savile in December 2011 was "flawed", but that it had not been done to protect the Savile tribute programmes. However, it criticised George Entwistle for apparently failing to read emails warning him of Savile's "dark side", and that, after the allegations against Savile eventually became public, the BBC fell into a "level of chaos and confusion [that] was even greater than was apparent at the time". The BBC announced that Newsnight editor Peter Rippon and deputy editor Liz Gibbons would be replaced.

Past elements

Newsnight Review
From 2000 until December 2009, on Friday evenings Newsnight was followed at 23:00 by Newsnight Review, a 35-minute consumer survey of the week's artistic and cultural highlights. Mark Lawson was the programme's main presenter in its Late Review incarnation, which began life as a strand of The Late Show. He continued to chair the panel of guest reviewers when it was relaunched as Newsnight Review in 2000, up until December 2005. The programme was presented by Kirsty Wark, Martha Kearney, John Wilson, Tim Marlow, Kwame Kwei-Armah and Hardeep Singh Kohli. Regular reviewers included Mark Kermode, Tom Paulin, Ekow Eshun and Germaine Greer.

As part of the BBC's commitment to moving programmes out of London, Newsnight Review finished on 18 December 2009 with a special hour-long edition. The programme was replaced by The Review Show, produced from Glasgow, which started on 22 January 2010. It had the same producer as Newsnight Review and was still presented by Kirsty Wark and Martha Kearney.

Closing segments and frivolity
Traditionally, there was a short stock market update at the end of each edition. In 2005, Newsnight's then editor, Peter Barron, replaced it with a 30-second weather forecast, arguing that the market data was available on the internet and that a weather forecast would be "more useful". The change provoked a flurry of complaints.

Paxman on one occasion adopted a sarcastic tone and announced: "So finally and controversially, tomorrow's weather forecast. It's a veritable smorgasbord. Sun, rain, thunder, hail, snow, cold, wind. Almost worth going to work."  On other occasions: "It's April, what do you expect?" and "Take an umbrella with you tomorrow." He claimed, nonetheless, that he was happy presenting the weather. Gavin Esler also joined in, announcing: "As for the spring, you can forget about that until further notice." The programme conducted a telephone poll. Michael Fish, a former weather forecaster, was seen arguing in favour of the weather forecast, while Norman Lamont, a former Chancellor of the Exchequer, argued for the market update. 62% of viewers voted in favour of the markets, and the update duly returned on Monday 18 April 2005.

Other stunts included, for a week at the end of January 2006, Newsnight playing the Radio 4 UK Theme, which was facing the axe, over its closing credits, while the edition of 24 April 2006 played out to the signature tune of the soon-to-be-axed BBC sports programme, Grandstand. In 2005, following a discussion about the return of Doctor Who to television after a nine-year absence, the programme ended with the Tardis dematerialisation sound, while presenter Jeremy Paxton faded from view as if dematerialising like a Time Lord.

Between January and June 2006 the programme included Gordaq, a spoof stock market index measuring the political performance of Chancellor of the Exchequer Gordon Brown. The index started at 100 and moved up or down depending on Brown's political situation, finishing at 101 on 30 June 2006.

In an early day motion of 3 November 2016, as a celebration of the "Brexit" vote for UK withdrawal from the European Union, Conservative Party MP Andrew Rosindell argued for a return to the broadcasting of "God Save the Queen" at the end of BBC One transmissions each day. The practice was dropped in 1997 ostensibly due to BBC One adopting 24-hour broadcasting by simulcasting BBC News 24 overnight, rendering closedown obsolete. That evening, Newsnight ended its broadcast with host of that night Kirsty Wark saying that they were "incredibly happy to oblige" Rosindell's request, before playing out to the video of the Sex Pistols' punk song of the same name, much to Rosindell's discontent.

Other media
Newsnight is available in the UK on BBC iPlayer for up to thirty days after broadcast. A weekly digest version of Newsnight is screened on BBC World News, focusing on "the best of the week's films and discussions."

From August 2013, Newsnight had a dedicated YouTube channel on which excerpts of programmes could be found. However, the channel was updated for the final time in September 2020 and replaced with sections of the episodes being released on BBC News' main YouTube channel.
KCET, an independent public television station in Los Angeles, broadcasts the weekly digest version.

Presenters, editors, and correspondents

Presenters

Editors and correspondents

Past presenters and reporters

Peter Snow, 1980–1997
John Tusa, 1980–1986
David Sells, 1980–2006
Peter Hobday, 1980–1983
Will Hutton, 1983–1988
Jenni Murray, 1984–1986
Olivia O'Leary, 1985–1986
Adam Raphael, 1987–1988 
Gordon Brewer, 1993–1999 (subsequently hosted Newsnight Scotland)
Steve Scott
Martha Kearney (Presenter and Political Editor), 1994–2010
Sarah Montague, 1998–2001
James Cox
Donald MacCormick
Eddie Mair (guest presenter)
Jon Sopel (guest presenter)
Francine Stock
Sue Cameron
Allegra Stratton (Political Editor)
Charles Wheeler
Jeremy Vine, 1999–2002
Michael Crick (Political Editor)
Paul Mason (Economics Editor)
Gavin Esler, 2003–2014
Jeremy Paxman, 1989–2014
Emma Barnett, 2018–2022
Evan Davis, 2014–2018
Katie Razzall (Relief Presenter) 2020
Faisal Islam (Relief Presenter) 2020
Mark Urban (Relief Presenter) 2020
James O'Brien
Susan Watts (Science Editor)
Nimrod Kamer (Buzz and Youth Correspondent)
Laura Kuenssberg (Presenter and Chief Correspondent), 2014–2015
Kavita Puri
Liz MacKean
Tim Whewell
Greg Palast
Emily Maitlis, 2006–2022
Roger Cook, 1980-1985

Newsnight editors

George Carey (1980–1981)
Ron Neil (1981–1982)
David Lloyd (1982–1983)
David Dickinson (1983–1985)
Richard Tait (1985–1987)
John Morrison (1987–1990)
Tim Gardam (1990–1993)
Peter Horrocks (1994–1997)
Sian Kevill (1998–2001)
George Entwistle (2001–2004)
Peter Barron (2004–2008)
Peter Rippon (2008–2012)
Ian Katz (2013–2017)
Esmé Wren (2018–2021)

References

Footnotes
 Newsnight 25 BBC mini-site to mark Newsnight's 25th anniversary in 2005
 Newsnight at 20: the awkward squad, Broadcast, 28 January 2000

External links

Paxarotti packs punch in Newsnight opera BBC News, 5 September 2003 – Newsnight: The Opera
Newsnight weathers storm as forecast is axed The Guardian, 15 April 2005

1980 British television series debuts
1990s British television series
2000s British television series
2010s British television series
2020s British television series
BBC television news shows
British television news shows
Current affairs shows
Peabody Award-winning television programs